Tolleson can refer to:

People

 Gina Tolleson, Miss World 1990
 Jeremy Tolleson, retired American soccer player
 Ross Tolleson (born 1956), Republican state senator from Georgia
 Steven Tolleson (born 1983), Major League Baseball player, son of Wayne Tolleson
 Tommy Tolleson (born 1943), American football player
 Wayne Tolleson (born 1955), Major League Baseball player

Places
 Tolleson, Arizona, a city